Da'Vone Travell McDonald (born February 10, 1985) is an American actor, best known for portraying "Dwayne the Bartender" from the successful 2008 romantic comedy Forgetting Sarah Marshall. He has since appeared in roles in a number of films such as Drillbit Taylor (2008), A Very Harold & Kumar 3D Christmas (2011), The Turkey Bowl (2019) and The Five-Year Engagement (2012) and has also guest-starred in various television series such as House M.D., Raising Hope, and Drunk History. Most of his roles are comedic in nature.

References

External links

Living people
1985 births
American male film actors
American male television actors
21st-century American male actors
Male actors from Los Angeles
African-American male actors
21st-century African-American people
20th-century African-American people